Obernsees is a village in Germany. It is part of the municipality Mistelgau in the district of Bayreuth in Bavaria.

References

External links
 

Villages in Bavaria